Tupik is the name of several rural localities in Russia:
Tupik, Republic of Khakassia, a village in Spirinsky Selsoviet of Shirinsky District of the Republic of Khakassia
Tupik, Novgorod Oblast, a village under the administrative jurisdiction of the urban-type settlement of Nebolchi, Lyubytinsky District, Novgorod Oblast
Tupik, Ryazan Oblast, a settlement in Merdushinsky Rural Okrug of Yermishinsky District of Ryazan Oblast
Tupik, Sverdlovsk Oblast, a settlement in Verkhnesaldinsky District of Sverdlovsk Oblast
Tupik, Vologda Oblast, a settlement in Toropovsky Selsoviet of Babayevsky District of Vologda Oblast
Tupik, Zabaykalsky Krai, a selo in Tungiro-Olyokminsky District of Zabaykalsky Krai